The University of Regina Press is a university press associated with the University of Regina, located in Regina, Saskatchewan. The press was founded in 2013 and publishes books on a variety of topics, including indigenous cultures, Canadian history, politics, environmentalism, social justice, and gender and sexuality. The University of Regina Press is a member of the Association of Canadian University Presses, the Association of Canadian Publishers, and the Association of University Presses.

See also

 List of English-language book publishing companies
 List of university presses

References

External links 
University of Regina Press

University of Regina Press
University presses of Canada